Santiago Fisas Ayxelà (also "Aixelás"; born 29 August 1948 in Barcelona) is a Spanish politician of the People's Party who served as a Member of the European Parliament from 2009 until 2019.

Early life and education
Qualified in law, he previously served as Secretary of State for Sport, and Minister of Sport and Culture in the Community of Madrid, while also being a patron of the Barcelona Museum of Contemporary Art.

Political career
Fisas was elected to the European Parliament after being put in the 23rd position in his party's list. During his first term from 2009 to 2014, he served on the Committee on Culture and Education. In 2014, he joined the Committee on International Trade.

Fisas led the 38-member EU-Election Observer Mission for the 2015 general election in Nigeria.

Controversy
In February 2016, Fisas was investigated by the Guardia Civil for financial irregularities stemming from a concert staged at the Palacio de Deportes de la Comunidad de Madrid in March 2007.

References

External links

European Parliament profile

1948 births
Living people
Politicians from Barcelona
People's Party (Spain) MEPs
MEPs for Spain 2009–2014
MEPs for Spain 2014–2019
Government ministers of the Community of Madrid